Michael Ray Turner (born January 11, 1960) is an American politician serving as the U.S. representative for  since 2003. He is a member of the Republican Party. Turner's district, numbered as the 3rd district from 2003 to 2013, is based in Dayton and consists of part of Clark County and all of Montgomery and Greene Counties.

Turner served as the president of the NATO Parliamentary Assembly from 2014 to 2016.

Early life, education, and career
A non-denominational Protestant Christian, Turner was born in 1960 in Dayton, Ohio, to Vivian and Ray Turner. His mother was a teacher in the Wayne School system in Huber Heights and his father worked as a member of IUE Local 801 for 42 years after serving in the military. Turner was raised in East Dayton and has one sister.

Turner graduated from Belmont High School in 1978 and received his Bachelor of Arts in political science from the Ohio Northern University in 1982, a Juris Doctor from Case Western Reserve University in 1985, an M.B.A. from the University of Dayton in 1992, and a D.L.S from Georgetown University in 2022. He practiced law with local firms and businesses in the Dayton area before entering politics. He also practiced law during the brief time between his service as mayor of Dayton and as a member of Congress.

Mayor of Dayton
Turner was elected mayor of Dayton, Ohio, in 1993, narrowly defeating incumbent Mayor Richard Clay Dixon. Before he took office, the city suffered a number of economic setbacks. Upon taking office, Turner focused on attracting business to the city and on redeveloping vacant and underutilized real estate packages known as brownfields.

During Turner's mayoralty, Dayton reached an agreement to construct a baseball stadium for a class A minor league team affiliated with the Cincinnati Reds.

Turner was the mayor of Dayton during the planning and construction of the Schuster Center, which he supported for its contribution to reviving downtown. He facilitated discussions with key leaders from the project's conception to its completion. The Schuster Center is a performing arts center at the corner of Second and Main Streets. It has served as a forum for the Victoria Theatre's Broadway Series, the Dayton Philharmonic Orchestra, the Dayton Ballet, and a speaking location for visiting political leaders, such as former New York Governor Mario Cuomo.

Turner also started a program called "Rehabarama", which attracted professionals to historic properties in the city. He was reelected in 1997 over Democratic City Commissioner Tony Capizzi. In 2001 he lost to then-State Senator Rhine McLin, 51.6% to 48.4%.

U.S. House of Representatives

Elections
2002

Turner received 58% of the vote following the retirement of 23-year incumbent Democrat Tony P. Hall from Congress after President George W. Bush named Hall U.N. Special Envoy for Hunger Issues. Earlier that year, Turner won the Republican nomination when he defeated Roy Brown with 80% of the vote. Brown was the son and grandson of former area Republican Congressmen Bud Brown and Clarence J. Brown and operated a local newspaper company, Brown Publishing. In the general election, Turner defeated Congressman Tony Hall's chief of staff, Rick Carne, after Carne won the Democratic nomination. Turner got a substantial assist from the 2000s round of redistricting. The old 7th had been a fairly compact district centered on Dayton, but redistricting added some Republican-leaning suburbs to the east.

2004

In 2004, Turner defeated former businesswoman Jane Mitakides with over 62% of the vote. The district was considered a key area in the swing state of Ohio in that year's presidential race.

2006

In 2006, the Democrats planned to target Turner for defeat. Three Democrats entered the Third District primary to run against Turner in the general election. Veterinarian Stephanie Studebaker defeated local bankruptcy attorney David Fierst and recalled Waynesville Mayor Charles W. Sanders. Studebaker had previously affiliated with former Vermont Governor Howard Dean's 2004 presidential campaign in Ohio. After winning the nomination, she and her husband Sam were both arrested for domestic violence. Studebaker subsequently dropped out of the race, citing her family concerns and impending legal issues. After her withdrawal, four Democrats entered a special primary to face Turner, won by former Assistant United States Attorney Richard Chema. Turner defeated Chema with 58% of the vote.

2008

Jane Mitakides beat Sanders in the Democratic primary and faced Turner in a rematch from 2004. Turner again focused largely on economic issues of job creation and protection for workers affected by the national and regional recession. In a difficult political climate for Republicans, Turner defeated Mitakides with 64% of the vote, his largest margin of victory in any election.

2010

Turner was challenged by first-time Democratic nominee 25-year-old Joe Roberts in the general election and won with 68% of the vote.

2012

After redistricting, Turner's district was renumbered the 10th district. It absorbed much of the neighboring 7th district, represented by fellow Republican Steve Austria. The district was made significantly more compact than its predecessor, absorbing all of Dayton.

It initially looked like Turner would face Austria in a primary, but Austria dropped out of the race, handing Turner the nomination. Turner then defeated Democratic attorney Sharon Neuhardt with 60% of the vote.

2020

Turner was challenged in the 2020 Republican primary by Kathi Flanders.

Tenure

Turner is a member of the Armed Services and Government Reform committees. In 2009, he was named Ranking Member on the Strategic Forces Subcommittee of the United States House Committee on Armed Services.

In January 2003, Turner was appointed to the Armed Services Committee, a position he has used to advocate for the Wright-Patterson Air Force Base in his district, and to the Government Reform Committee.

Due to his urban background, focus on the economic redevelopment of cities, and service as Dayton's mayor, Turner is sometimes described as an "urban Republican". Recognizing Turner's work on urban development, then-House Speaker Dennis Hastert appointed Turner chair of the Saving America's Cities working group. The group was formed to work with the Bush administration to "foster economic development and redevelopment and streamline government services in America's cities to help them prosper and grow."

During the 109th Congress, Turner served on the House Veterans' Affairs Committee, in addition to his work on his two other committees, the House Armed Services and Government Reform Committees.

Serving on the Armed Services Committee, Turner advocated for an expansion to Wright-Patterson Air Force Base, providing testimony to the Base Realignment and Closure Commission (BRAC). This effort proved successful in 2008, when the Air Force announced that 1,000 jobs and over $230 million in federal funding would move to Wright-Patterson AFB. Turner has said that this is the largest single investment in Wright-Patterson since World War II.

In 2006, the Dayton Development Coalition (DDC), a nonprofit and nominally nonpartisan group (though most of the trustees have contributed to Turner's campaigns) that advocates for federal funds for economic development in the Miami Valley, began a regional branding campaign. Turner's wife's company Turner Effect was awarded a contract without competitive bidding to conduct the marketing research associated with the campaign. In April 2008, Turner Effect withdrew from the branding implementation contract after more details of the agreement became public, including details about the more than $300,000 awarded to her company.

The DDC said that its members were "unanimous" in their decision that there was "no conflict [of interest]" in their having chosen Turner's company, but watchdog groups and media reports raised concerns about a possible conflict of interest.

In the same year, Turner's campaign committee Citizens for Turner contracted with Turner Effect for professional services, such as the production of literature.

On July 7, 2008, Turner wrote an op-ed in the Hillsboro Times-Gazette in support of the Post-9/11 Veterans Educational Assistance Act of 2008, referred to as the GI Bill. In May of that year, Turner opposed an earlier version of the GI Bill. Turner has been endorsed by the Veterans of Foreign Wars PAC.

In October 2008, Turner joined then Senator Hillary Clinton, First Lady Laura Bush, Senator Pete Domenici and Representative Brad Miller to announce the introduction of bipartisan legislation that would permanently authorize two historic preservation grant programs. The bill, H.R. 3981, would permanently authorize the programs known as "Save America's Treasures", established by the Clinton administration, and "Preserve America", established by the Bush administration. It was introduced in the House by Turner and Miller as co-chairs of the Congressional Historic Preservation Caucus and in the Senate by Clinton and Domenici. The two grant programs are complementary. Preserve America supports "community efforts to demonstrate sustainable uses of their historic and cultural sites, focusing on economic and educational opportunities related to heritage tourism." The Save America's Treasures grant program "funds 'bricks-and-mortar' projects by helping local communities develop sustainable resource management strategies and sound business practices for the continued preservation and use of heritage assets."

In June 2009, Turner introduced H.J. Res 57, the "Preserving Capitalism in America" amendment to the United States Constitution. This amendment, which has 104 cosponsors in the House, would prohibit the United States government from owning any stock in corporations. The amendment did not become law.

In February 2010, Turner released a report on "The Impact of the Housing Crisis on Local Communities and the Federal Response" in conjunction with the Northeast-Midwest Institute and the Northeast-Midwest Congressional Coalition. The report included testimony and proposals from Dayton community leaders such as Commissioner Dean Lovelace and Miami Valley Fair Housing Center CEO Jim McCarthy, who participated in an August 2009 housing and foreclosure crisis forum in Dayton. Turner indicated he would offer legislation based on the recommendations of the report.

Turner voted against the Patient Protection and Affordable Care Act and the Health Care and Education Reconciliation Act of 2010 and in the coming years repeatedly voted for its repeal. He opposed the "$1 trillion government takeover of our nation's health care system" because it would "increase budget deficits and decrease the quality of our health care services", he said.

Turner was highly critical of the Obama administration's Phased Adaptive Approach and Nuclear Posture Review regarding the protection and defense of the U.S. and allies.

In 2012, Turner called for a missile defense site on the east coast of the United States, to defend against missiles launched from Iran. The east coast site would be the third such site, joining two others on the west coast designed to defend against an attack from North Korea.

In 2018, Turner was named to the United States House Permanent Select Committee on Intelligence.

After the Dayton shooting in August 2019, Turner announced he would back legislation barring the "sale of military-style weapons to civilians" and also said he would support a limit on magazines and the creation of legislation that would keep guns from people deemed dangerous by the police. He had previously "generally backed gun-rights measures during his nine terms in the House", earning a 93% approval rating from the National Rifle Association in prior years. Turner's daughter had been across the street from the attack. In 2018 and 2019 he "led the Ohio congressional delegation... in advocating to bring the F-35 program" to Wright-Patterson Air Force Base, which happened in May 2019. As of May 2019, he was the top Republican on the House Armed Service's Strategic Forces Subcommittee. In April 2019, he created a panel to "independently review" the water quality in the Dayton area.

Turner was one of three Ohio Republicans appointed to an Intelligence Committee that examined whether Trump had improperly withheld aid to Ukraine. He stated the conversation between Trump and the Ukrainian president was "not ok", but that impeachment was an "assault" on the electorate. On November 19, 2019, Trump praised his questioning of witnesses in the impeachment inquiry in a tweet.

In February 2022, Turner promoted debunked lies about the pleadings John Durham filed as special prosecutor, claiming that they proved that Hillary Clinton "spied" on Trump's presidential campaign and on Trump's White House. Durham denied in open court that these allegations are a truthful interpretation of his pleadings, but Turner continued to publicly disseminate the allegations.

Following accusations that Donald Trump had kept classified documents at Mar-a-Lago after his presidency ended, Turner said on Fox News that he thought the matter was "more like a bookkeeping issue than it is a national security threat".

Political positions

Immigration
Turner voted for the Further Consolidated Appropriations Act of 2020 which authorizes DHS to nearly double the available H-2B visas for the remainder of FY 2020.

Turner voted for the Consolidated Appropriations Act (H.R. 1158) which effectively prohibits ICE from cooperating with Health and Human Services to detain or remove illegal alien sponsors of unaccompanied alien children (UACs).

LGBT rights
On July 19, 2022, Turner and 46 other Republican Representatives voted for the Respect for Marriage Act, which would codify the right to same-sex marriage in federal law.

Syria
In 2023, Turner voted against H.Con.Res. 21 which directed President Joe Biden to remove U.S. troops from Syria within 180 days.

Committee assignments
Committee on Intelligence (Ranking Member (2022-2023); Chairman (2023-))
Committee on Armed Services
Subcommittee on Tactical Air and Land Forces Former Chairman
Subcommittee on Strategic Forces

Caucus memberships
 House Baltic Caucus
Republican Governance Group
Republican Main Street Partnership 
Republican Study Committee 
 Former Mayor's Caucus
 Historic Preservation Caucus
 Real Estate Caucus
 Urban Caucus
 Census Caucus
Romanian Congressional Caucus
 Saving America's Cities Working Group, Founder and Chairman
 House Republican Policy Committee's Task Force on Urban Revitalization, Chairman
 Congressional Manufacturing Task Force
 Northeast-Midwest Congressional Coalition Revitalizing Older Cities Task Force, Co-Chairman

Electoral history

*In 2002, Ronald Williamitis received 14 votes.

*In 2016, David Harlow received 7 votes.

Controversies 
Allegations of self-enrichment

In both 2008 and 2010 Turner was listed as one of the "most corrupt members of Congress" by the Citizens for Responsibility and Ethics in Washington for "enrichment of self, family, or friends" and "solicitation of gifts".

In 2006, a marketing firm owned by Turner's first wife, Lori, was hired without competitive bidding by the Dayton Development Coalition, an organization that lobbies for federal funds from congressmen such as Turner, to develop a regional rebranding campaign. She withdrew from the coalition in 2008, weeks after reports of the agreement surfaced that also revealed that her firm was compensated at least $300,000 to produce the slogan "Get Midwest".

A 2008 report released by the Citizens for Responsibility and Ethics in Washington detailed $54,065 that Turner's election committee had paid to his wife's company between 2002 and 2006 based on public campaign finance disclosures.

According to analysis conducted by the Dayton Daily News in 2016, when Turner came to Congress in 2002, he claimed between $153,026 and $695,000 worth of assets on his financial disclosure form. In 2016, he claimed between $2.8 million and $10.3 million. The paper credited his second marriage to an energy lobbyist as a contributing reason for the increase, since her assets as well as his were listed on his 2016 financial disclosure form. Their relationship raised red flags when Turner was accused of authoring natural gas legislation that might benefit her employer at the time, Cheniere Energy.

Absence of local town halls

At multiple times during his tenure in Congress, Turner has faced protests from constituents for refusing to host public town hall events, presumably over fear that the events would draw strong backlash from constituents over repeated efforts to repeal the Affordable Care Act that Republicans in neighboring districts and around the country experienced.

Citizens Against Government Waste

At various times Turner has been criticized by fiscally conservative groups, such as the Citizens Against Government Waste, for siphoning federal taxpayer dollars to local line-item projects, specifically after obtaining $250,000 to a local theater in his district in Wilmington, Ohio, and $4,000,000 for Open Source Research Centers intended for Radiance Technologies in Fairborn, Ohio.

In April 2019, Citizens Against Government Waste named Turner the "Porker of the Month" for leading the effort to "spend more taxpayer dollars on the most expensive weapons system in U.S. history", the F-35 program. This designation came in recognition for his continued support for expansion of the program, which had already been in development for 17 years, was seven years behind schedule, and was nearly $200 billion over budget. In March, Air Force Secretary Heather Wilson raised concerns about the soaring expense, saying, "we just don't think that there has been enough attention on the sustainment costs of the aircraft and driving them down." This criticism added to the existing House Armed Services Committee report from 2018 stating that the F-35 "may not have the range it needs to strike enemy targets" and that "the Joint Strike Fighter initiative, the most expensive weapons program in history, may actually have been out of date years ago."

Sutorina dispute involvement 
On March 3, 2015, Montenegrin, Bosnian, and other Balkan-based news agencies reported that Turner had involved himself in the Sutorina dispute between Bosnia and Montenegro, sending a letter of warning to Bosniak member of the Presidency of Bosnia and Herzegovina Bakir Izetbegovic in which he suggested that if Bosnia did not give up its territorial dispute over Sutorina the United States might suspend its aid to Bosnia.

Personal life
In 1987, Turner married Lori Turner, a health executive. They have two daughters. After 25 years of marriage, they announced their separation in 2012 and divorced in 2013. Turner married Majida Mourad on December 19, 2015, at Westminster Presbyterian Church in downtown Dayton. Representative Darrell Issa was a groomsman at the wedding. In May 2017, after less than two years of marriage, Turner filed for divorce from Mourad, alleging that Mourad "is guilty of a fraudulent contract". As part of the acrimonious divorce, Turner's lawyers wrote to Issa "stating they would like to depose" him, but lawyers for both sides later released a statement that "Majida Mourad and Congressman Michael Turner have come to a resolution".

References

External links

 Congressman Michael Turner official U.S. House website
 Mike Turner for Congress
 
 
 
 Advocacy group ratings from The Hill, 2010
 Profile at SourceWatch, archived from 2007

|-

|-

|-

|-

|-

|-

1960 births
21st-century American politicians
Case Western Reserve University School of Law alumni
Living people
Mayors of Dayton, Ohio
Ohio Northern University alumni
Republican Party members of the United States House of Representatives from Ohio
University of Dayton alumni